Yang Hak-jin (born 26 August 1991), sometimes credited mononymously as Hak-jin, is a South Korean actor and model. He is best known for his roles in Clean with Passion for Now, Solomon's Perjury and Reset.

Biography and career
Yang Hak-jin was born on August 16, 1991, he was a former professional volleyball player for 10 years before a knee injury ended his career. He gained recognition after appearing in the sports variety show Cool Kiz on the Block in 2016. He made his acting debut in 2014 in drama Reset and later acted in the web drama Night Teacher, also in the Viki Original series Tong: Memories and the television dramas such as The Miracle and Solomon's Perjury.

Filmography

Television series

References

External links 
 
 
 

1991 births
Living people
21st-century South Korean male actors
South Korean male models
South Korean male television actors